Edmund Leonard Thigpen (December 28, 1930 – January 13, 2010) was an American jazz drummer, best known for his work with the Oscar Peterson trio from 1959 to 1965. Thigpen also performed with the Billy Taylor trio from 1956 to 1959.

Biography
Born in Chicago, Illinois, United States, Thigpen was raised in Los Angeles, California, and attended Thomas Jefferson High School, where Art Farmer, Dexter Gordon and Chico Hamilton also attended. After majoring in sociology at Los Angeles City College, Thigpen returned to East St. Louis for one year to pursue music while living with his father who had been playing with Andy Kirk's Clouds of Joy. His father, Ben Thigpen, was a drummer who played with Andy Kirk for sixteen years during the 1930s and 1940s.

Thigpen first worked professionally in New York City with the Cootie Williams orchestra from 1951 to 1952 at the Savoy Ballroom. During this time he played with musicians such as Dinah Washington, Gil Mellé, Oscar Pettiford, Eddie Vinson, Paul Quinichette, Ernie Wilkins, Charlie Rouse, Lennie Tristano, Jutta Hipp, Johnny Hodges, Dorothy Ashby, Bud Powell, and Billy Taylor.

In 1959, he replaced guitarist Herb Ellis in the Oscar Peterson Trio in Toronto, Ontario, Canada. In 1961 he recorded in Los Angeles, featuring on the Teddy Edwards–Howard McGhee Quintet album entitled Together Again for the Contemporary label with Phineas Newborn Jr. and Ray Brown. After leaving Peterson, Thigpen recorded the album Out of the Storm as a leader for Verve in 1966. He then went on to tour with Ella Fitzgerald from 1967 to 1972.

In 1972, Thigpen moved to Copenhagen, joining several other American jazz musicians who had settled in that city over the previous two decades. There he worked with fellow American expatriates, including Kenny Drew, Ernie Wilkins, Thad Jones, as well as leading Danish jazz musicians such as Svend Asmussen, Mads Vinding, Alex Riel and Niels-Henning Ørsted Pedersen. He also played with a variety of other leading musicians of the time, such as Clark Terry, Eddie "Lockjaw" Davis, Milt Jackson and Monty Alexander.

Thigpen died peacefully after a brief period in Hvidovre Hospital in Copenhagen on January 13, 2010. He had been hospitalized for heart and lung problems and was also suffering from Parkinson's disease. He is buried at Vestre Kirkegård.

Awards and recognition
Thigpen was inducted into the Percussive Arts Society Hall of Fame in 2002.

Discography

As leader
1966: Out of the Storm (Verve)
1974: Action-Re-Action (Sonet Records)
1974:   Explosive Drums (Black & Blue)
1990: Young Men and Olds (Timeless Records)
1992: Mr. Taste (Justin Time Records)
Stunt Records
1990: Easy Flight
1998: It's Entertainment
2002: Element of Swing
2004: #1

As sideman
With Gene Ammons
Velvet Soul (Prestige, 1962 [1964])
Angel Eyes (Prestige, 1962 [1965])
Sock! (Prestige, 1962, [1965])
With Toshiko Akiyoshi
The Toshiko Trio (Storyville, 1956) 
With Dorothy Ashby
The Jazz Harpist (Regent, 1957)
With Kenny Burrell
Earthy (Prestige, 1957)
With Benny Carter
Summer Serenade (Storyville, 1980 [1982])
With Kenny Drew
Your Soft Eyes (Soul Note, 1981) 
With Art Farmer
Three Trumpets (Prestige, 1957) with Donald Byrd and Idrees Sulieman
Manhattan (Soul Note, 1981)
With Dexter Gordon 
More Than You Know (SteepleChase, 1975)
With Johnny Griffin
Blues for Harvey (SteepleChase, 1973)
With Jutta Hipp
At the Hickory House Volume 1 (1956)
At the Hickory House Volume 2 (1956)
Jutta Hipp with Zoot Sims (1956)
With Duke Jordan
 Flight to Denmark (SteepleChase, 1973 [1974])
Two Loves (SteepleChase, 1973 [1975])
Truth (SteepleChase, 1975 [1983])
With Mundell Lowe
A Grand Night for Swinging (Riverside, 1957)
With Howard McGhee and Teddy Edwards
Together Again!!!! (Contemporary, 1961)
With Gil Mellé
 Patterns in Jazz (1956; Blue Note)
Primitive Modern (Prestige, 1956)
 Gil's Guests (1957; Prestige)
With Oscar Pettiford
 Winner's Circle (1957; Bethlehem)
With Oscar Peterson
 Oscar Peterson Plays "My Fair Lady" (1958, Verve)
 Sonny Stitt Sits in with the Oscar Peterson Trio (1958, Verve)
 A Jazz Portrait of Frank Sinatra (1959, Verve)
 The Jazz Soul of Oscar Peterson (1959, Verve)
 Porgy and Bess (1959, Verve)
 Oscar Peterson Plays the Duke Ellington Songbook (1959, Verve)
 Oscar Peterson Plays the George Gershwin Songbook (1959, Verve)
 Oscar Peterson Plays the Richard Rodgers Songbook (1959, Verve)	
 Oscar Peterson Plays the Jerome Kern Songbook (1959, Verve)
 Oscar Peterson Plays the Cole Porter Songbook (1959, Verve)
 Oscar Peterson Plays the Harry Warren Songbook (1959, Verve)
 Oscar Peterson Plays the Irving Berlin Songbook (1959, Verve)
 Oscar Peterson Plays the Harold Arlen Songbook (1959, Verve)
 Oscar Peterson Plays the Jimmy McHugh Songbook (1959, Verve)
 Oscar Peterson Plays Porgy & Bess (1959, Verve)
 Swinging Brass with the Oscar Peterson Trio (1959, Verve)
 Ben Webster Meets Oscar Peterson (1959, Verve)
 Live from Chicago (1961, Verve)
 Very Tall (1961, Verve)
 Night Train (1962, Verve)
 Affinity (1962, Verve)
 West Side Story (1962, Verve)
 The Oscar Peterson Trio in Tokyo 1964 (1964; Pablo)
 We Get Requests (1964, Verve)
 Oscar Peterson Trio + One – with Clark Terry (1964, Verve)
 I/We Had a Ball (Limelight, 1965) - 1 track
 Eloquence (1965, Limelight)
 Oscar Peterson with Clark Terry (1982, Mercury Jazz Masters)
With Paul Quinichette
On the Sunny Side (Prestige, 1957)
With Teddy Charles
 Salute to Hamp (1958; Bethlehem)
With Tony Ortega
 Jazz for Young Moderns (1958, 1959; Bethlehem)
With Frank Minion
 The Soft Land of Make Believe (1959; Bethlehem)
With Teddy Edwards–Howard McGhee Quintet
 Howard McGhee/Teddy Edwards – Together Again! (Contemporary M 3588, S 7588; Fantasy OJC 424, OJCCD 424-2)
With Ella Fitzgerald:
 Ella in Budapest, Hungary (1970; Pablo)
 Ella à Nice (1971; Pablo Live)
 Jazz at Santa Monica Civic '72 (1972; Pablo)
 Ella Loves Cole (1972; Atlantic), reissued as Dream Dancing (1978; Pablo)
With Horace Parlan
 Arrival (1973, SteepleChase)
With Charlie Rouse and Paul Quinichette
The Chase Is On (Bethlehem, 1958)
With Billy Taylor
 My Fair Lady Loves Jazz (ABC-Paramount, 1957)
 The New Billy Taylor Trio (ABC-Paramount, 1957)
 The Billy Taylor Touch (Atlantic, 1957)
Taylor Made Jazz (Argo, 1959)
With Cal Tjader
 The Prophet (Verve 1968)
With Paul Quinichette and Charlie Rouse
 "The Chase Is On" (1957; Bethlehem)
 When The Blues Comes On, Pt. 1&2 (1957; Bethlehem)
With Eddie "Cleanhead" Vinson
Clean Head's Back in Town (Bethlehem, 1957)
With Frank Wess
Jazz for Playboys (Savoy, 1957)
With Webster Young
For Lady (Prestige, 1957)
With Svend Asmussen
 As Time Goes By (1978; Sonet Records)
With Jack van Poll:
 Cat's Groove (1988; September Records)
With Oliver Jones:
 A Class Act (1991; Justin Time Records)
With John Lindberg, Albert Mangelsdorff & Eric Watson:
 Quartet Afterstorm (1994; Black Saint)
With Eric Watson and Mark Dresser:
 Silent Hearts (2001; Sunnyside Records)
With Ernie Wilkins on the Everest label:
 Everest Years (CD; 1959, 1960; 2005; VI Music)
With Kai Winding and Curtis Fuller
Giant Bones '80 (Sonet, 1980)
With Kresten Osgood
 Sound (vinyl; 2011; Ilk Records)
With Berlin Contemporary Jazz Orchestra
 Berlin Contemporary Jazz Orchestra (ECM, 1990)

References

External links

Ed Thigpen Interview NAMM Oral History Library (2004)

African-American drummers
American jazz drummers
Hard bop drummers
Bebop drummers
Verve Records artists
Timeless Records artists
Musicians from Chicago
1930 births
2010 deaths
Burials at Vestre Cemetery, Copenhagen
American expatriates in Denmark
American emigrants to Denmark
Naturalised citizens of Denmark
Jazz musicians from Illinois
Almost Big Band members
Justin Time Records artists
Black Saint/Soul Note artists
Ilk Records artists
Jefferson High School (Los Angeles) alumni
20th-century African-American people
21st-century African-American people
Oscar Peterson Trio members